Saku may refer to:

Places
Saku, Nagano, a city in Japan
Saku, Nagano (Minamisaku), a town in Japan
Saku Parish, a rural municipality in Harju County, Estonia
Saku, Estonia, a small borough in Saku Parish, Harju County, Estonia
Saku Constituency, an electoral constituency in Kenya

Other uses
Saku (given name), a masculine Finnish given name and a feminine Japanese given name
Saku Brewery, an Estonian brewery
Saku, a song by the band Dir En Grey